Pseudonebularia cucumerina, common name : the kettle mitre,  is a species of sea snail, a marine gastropod mollusk in the family Mitridae, the miters or miter snails.

Description
The shell size varies between 9 mm and 35 mm.

Distribution
This species occurs in the Red Sea and in the Indian Ocean off Aldabra, Chagos, Madagascar, Mauritius, and the Mascarene Basin; in the Pacific Ocean off Fiji, the Solomons Islands, the Philippines, Okinawa, Australia, Papua New Guinea.

References

 Cernohorsky W. O. (1976). The Mitrinae of the World. Indo-Pacific Mollusca 3(17) page(s): 400
 Drivas, J. & M. Jay (1988). Coquillages de La Réunion et de l'île Maurice

External links
 ) Lamarck (J.B.M.de). (1811). Suite de la détermination des espèces de Mollusques testacés. Mitre (Mitra.). Annales du Muséum National d'Histoire Naturelle. 17: 195-222
 Dautzenberg, P. & Bouge, L. J. (1923). Mitridés de la Nouvelle-Calédonie et de ses dépendances. Journal de Conchyliologie. 67(2): 83-159 [15 February 1923; 67(3): 179-259, pl. 2 ]
  Fedosov A., Puillandre N., Herrmann M., Kantor Yu., Oliverio M., Dgebuadze P., Modica M.V. & Bouchet P. (2018). The collapse of Mitra: molecular systematics and morphology of the Mitridae (Gastropoda: Neogastropoda). Zoological Journal of the Linnean Society. 183(2): 253-337.

Mitridae
Gastropods described in 1811